Concordia Tornados is the women's soccer team of Concordia University Texas. It is affiliated with the American Southwest Conference of NCAA Division III.

See also
Concordia Tornados men's soccer

References

NCAA Division III women's soccer teams
Women's